Vernon County is one of the 141 Cadastral divisions of New South Wales, Australia.  The Macleay River is part of the border in the north-east. It includes Walcha.

Vernon County was named in honour of George John Venables-Vernon, 5th Baron Vernon (1803–1866).

Parishes within this county
A full list of parishes found within this county; their current LGA and mapping coordinates to the approximate centre of each location is as follows:

References

Counties of New South Wales